Bluetown is a census-designated place (CDP) in Cameron County, in the U.S. state of Texas. The population was 356 at the 2010 census. Prior to the 2010 census the community was part of the Bluetown-Iglesia Antigua CDP. It is part of the Brownsville–Harlingen Metropolitan Statistical Area.

Geography
Bluetown is in southwestern Cameron County, bordered to the west by Iglesia Antigua and to the south by the Rio Grande, which forms the Mexico–United States border. U.S. Route 281 passes through the community, leading southeast  to Brownsville and west  to Hidalgo.

References

Census-designated places in Cameron County, Texas
Census-designated places in Texas